Goniodoris castanea is a species of sea slug, a dorid nudibranch, a marine gastropod mollusc in the family Goniodorididae.

Distribution
This species was first described from Salcombe Estuary, Devon. It has subsequently been reported widely in Britain and Ireland and from Norway to the Mediterranean Sea.

Description
This goniodorid nudibranch is variable in colour, usually red-brown or dark purple but also bright red. Most individuals have scattered irregular small patches of white or grey all over the body.

Its body length is usually 15 mm. The maximum recorded body length is 38 mm.

Ecology
Goniodoris castanea feeds on tunicates of the genera Botryllus and Botrylloides, family Botryllidae.

References

External links
 

Goniodorididae
Gastropods described in 1845